Sclerodermus domesticus, also known as Scleroderma domesticus, Scleroderma domesticum, Scleroderma domestica or "antiquarian's friend", is a species of cuckoo wasp in the insect genus Sclerodermus. It was first described by Johann Christoph Friedrich Klug in 1809.

Description

Sclerodermus domesticus preys on Coleoptera including Anobium punctatum, Stegobium paniceum, Lasioderma serricorne, Hylotrupes bajulus and Nicobium castaneum, or occasionally Lepidoptera.

Males have wings but lack a stinger. Females are 2–5 mm long; they have a stinger but lack wings. They are black/brown, and have the appearance of ants. Females enter woodworm holes, paralyze the woodworm larvae with the venom of the stinger and lay their eggs in the corpses, which form the food for the S. domesticus larvae. This behavior leads to the common name of "antiquarian's friend".

Distribution and habitat

S. domesticus is a cosmopolitan species. It prefers mild weather. There are reports of the species in Spain, Italy, France, Portugal, (Germany), United Kingdom, former Yugoslavia, Near East, United States and Costa Rica. It can be found inside homes, mostly in old furniture, harboring woodworms. Stings are painful and can cause rash or dermatitis.

References

Further reading

Parasitic infestations, stings, and bites of the skin
Parasitic wasps
Chrysidoidea